Lefébre Rademan (born 22 August 1996) is a South African netball player, who has represented the national team. At club level, she plays for Celtic Dragons in the British Netball Superleague (NSL), and has previously played for London Pulse in the NSL and Free State Crinums in the South African Netball League.

Personal life
Rademan is from Riversdale, Western Cape, South Africa. She attended Langenhoven High School, and later studied education at the University of the Free State in Bloemfontein.

Club career
Rademan started her career as a defender, but now plays as either a goal attack or a wing attack. Whilst at the University of the Free State, Rademan played Varsity netball for their team, the Kovsies. She later captained the side. She was part of the 2018 Kovsies team that won the Varsity Cup, and in 2019, she was named the season's best player and player's player of the year.

In the same year, Rademan played for Free State Crinums in the South African Netball League. She was the Crinums' captain, and they finished third in the league. Rademan won four player of the match awards in the tournament. In 2020, she captained the Free State Crinums again, and was named Shooter of the Tournament. The Crinums came second, losing in the final to Gauteng Jaguars. Ahead of the 2021 Netball Superleague season, Rademan signed for London Pulse. She made her debut for London Pulse in a match against Surrey Storm in February 2021. Ahead of the 2022 Netball Superleague season, Rademan signed for Celtic Dragons, and she re-signed for the team for the 2023 season.

International career
In her matric year (final year of high school), Rademan played for South Africa under-18s. She has also played for South Africa under-21s, and represented them at the 2017 Netball World Youth Cup.

Rademan received her first callup to the South Africa national netball team whilst in the middle of a coaching session in Bloemfontein. She made her debut in an October 2019 Africa Netball Cup match against Lesotho, and she also played in South Africa's Africa Cup matches against Malawi, Uganda, Kenya, Zimbabwe, and Zambia. Later in the year, she played in the series against England. In 2020, she played in the Netball Nations Cup, and in South Africa's series against Malawi. Rademan was unable to play for South Africa in their 2021 SPAR Challenge Series matches against Uganda and Namibia as the rearranged dates clashed with her London Pulse matches. Rademan played at the 2022 Commonwealth Games, where she sustained an anterior cruciate ligament injury.

References

External links
 Netball South Africa
 Varsity profile
 Netball Superleague

Living people
1996 births
South African netball players
Celtic Dragons players
London Pulse players
Netball Superleague players
South African expatriate netball people in England
University of the Free State alumni
Sportspeople from the Western Cape